La Coupe de l'Outre-Mer de football 2010 was the 2010 edition of the Coupe de l'Outre-Mer. The competition took place from 22 September 2010 to 2 October 2010 in Île-de-France, France.  It was Saint Pierre and Miquelon's first appearance in the tournament.

Venues
Parc des Sports Louis Boury- Gennevilliers, Hauts de Seine
Parc des Sports des Maisons Rouges- Bry-sur-Marne, Val-de-Marne
Stade Bauer- Saint-Ouen, Seine-Saint-Denis
Stade Dominique Duvauchelle- Créteil, Val-de-Marne
Stade Georges Pompidou- Villemomble, Seine-Saint-Denis
Stade Henri-Longuet- Viry-Châtillon, Essonne
Stade Jean Rolland- Franconville, Val d'Oise
Stade Louison Bobet- Le Plessis-Trévise, Val de Marne
Stade Langrenay- Longjumeau, Essonne
Stade Michel Hidalgo - Saint-Gratien, Val-d'Oise

Participants

Teams that did not compete

Matches

Group stage

Group A 

Note: 4 points for a win, 2 points for a win on penalties, 1 point for a loss on penalties

Group B 

Note: 4 points for a win, 2 points for a win on penalties, 1 point for a loss on penalties

Third-place match

Final

Goalscorers
4 goals
 Ludovic Gotin
 Patrick Percin
 El Habib N'Daka
3 goals
 Abdou-Lihariti Antoissi
 Willy Visnelda
2 goals

 Marc-Frederic Habran
 Orpheo Nalie
 Anthony Tuinfort
 Quency Yenoumou
 Jean-Luc Lambourde
 Ithzak Youssouf Ibrahim
 Jérémy Basquaise
 Eric Farro
 Olivier Gastrin

1 goal

 Rhudy Evens
 Minnji Gomez
 Dominique Moka
 Rodrigue Audel
 Steeve Gustan
 Kevin Parsemain
 Karl Vitulin
 Moussa Bamana
 Darouech Bourahima
 Sebastien Filomar
 Mansour Ramia
 Michel Hmaé
 Francis Waltrone
 Raimana Li Fung Kee
 Lorenzo Tehau
 Axel Williams
 Johan Boulard
 John Elcaman
 Jean-Michel Fontaine
 Pascal N'Gongué
 William Mounoussamy

External links
Futbol Planet Summary
Official Tournament Site

2008
2010–11 in French football
2010–11 in Caribbean football
2010–11 in OFC football
2010 in African football